The 2020 Russian Mixed Curling Championship were held from September 5 to 11 at the Palace of Figure Skating and Curling in Dmitrov, Moscow Oblast.

Teams

Round robin

Group A

Group B

 Teams to playoffs
Points: 2 for win, 1 for loss, 0 for technical loss (did not start)

Playoffs

Semi-finalsSeptember 10, 9:00

Bronze medal gameSeptember 10, 14:00

FinalSeptember 10, 14:00

Final standings

References

External links

 Video: YouTube channel "Russian Curling TV"

See also
2020 Russian Men's Curling Championship
2020 Russian Women's Curling Championship
2020 Russian Mixed Doubles Curling Championship
2020 Russian Junior Curling Championships
2020 Russian Wheelchair Curling Championship

Curling competitions in Russia
Russian Mixed Curling Championship
Russian Mixed Curling Championship
Mixed Wheelchair Championship
Russian Mixed Curling Championship
Sport in Moscow Oblast